Jason Perry (born September 24, 1984 in Cleveland, Ohio) is a former American football player. He played defensive back for Youngstown State. He was signed as a free agent by the Jacksonville Sharks in 2009.

External links
 Jacksonville Sharks Bio

1984 births
Living people
American football defensive backs
Orlando Predators players
Jacksonville Sharks players
Youngstown State Penguins football players
Players of American football from Cleveland